Rauli Virtanen (born 28 June 1948) is a Finnish writer, freelance journalist, lecturer and television producer. He has covered wars and conflicts since the days of Vietnam and has travelled in 194 countries. He has been a foreign correspondent based in New York and London and a roving correspondent based in Finland.

Virtanen has worked for all the major Finnish print and electronic media, and 
his articles have also been published in the foreign media.

He has written seven non-fiction books.

In 2015-2016 Rauli Virtanen was the visiting professor of journalism at the University of Tampere.

In 2017 he was elected to the Espoo City Council as an independent on the Green Party list.

Awards
Virtanen is the recipient of many recognitions and  top journalism awards in Finland:
Valtion tiedonjulkistamispalkinto
Suomen Kuvalehden journalistipalkinto.
SPR:n Inhimillinen kädenojennus-tunnustus
Urho Kekkosen 70-vuotisjuhlasäätiön palkinto
Sotilasansiomitali
Alfred Kordelin-palkinto

References

Finnish non-fiction writers
Finnish television journalists
Finnish television producers
1948 births
Living people